Mister Panamá is a men's pageant held in Panama. The winner and finalists from the contest go on to represent Panama in many international pageants.

Organization
The Mister Panamá pageant was started under the guardianship of the agency Panama Talents with the intent of creating a men's contest with the same discipline, quality and success of its feminine counterpart.Although currently the contest is carried out by the Mister Panama Oficial Organization who is in charge of choosing the representatives heading to the grand slam contests

Titleholders

List of Mister Panamá at International pageants 
Color key

Manhunt International
The candidate who represents Panama at Mister Manhunt International is also elected at the Mister Panamá  pageant.

Mister World

Mister International

Mister Supranational

Mister Universe Model

Mister Global

Mister Universal Ambassador

Mr. Tourism International

Mister Grand Internacional

Caballero Universal

The Best Male Model Of The Universe

References

See also
 Señorita Panamá
 Manhunt International
 Mister International
 Mister World

Panama
Beauty pageants in Panama
Panamanian awards
Panama
Mister Global by country